Pieter Rossouw (born June 19, 1980) is a Namibian cricketer. A wicket-keeper, he represented Namibia Under-19s at the 1998 Under-19s World Cup of 1998, as an upper-middle-order batsman.

Almost exactly seven years later, he was to represent Namibia once again in a tour of Zimbabwe, playing one match in Windhoek.

Rossouw made his List A debut for the side in December 2009, against the United Arab Emirates, scoring 11 not out.

External links
Pieter Rossouw at Cricket Archive

1980 births
Living people
People from Keetmanshoop
Namibian cricketers